The Lalana River is a river of Oaxaca and Veracruz states of Mexico. 

It originates in the Sierra de Villa Alta sub-range of the Sierra Madre de Oaxaca in Oaxaca, and flows northeastwards onto the Gulf Coastal Plain, where it joins the Trinidad River in Veracruz to form the San Juan River. The San Juan is a tributary of the Papaloapan River, which empties into the Gulf of Mexico.

The lower Lalana River forms a portion of the boundary between Oaxaca and Veracruz.

See also
List of rivers of Mexico

References

The Prentice Hall American World Atlas, 1984.
Rand McNally, The New International Atlas, 1993.

Papaloapan River
Rivers of Oaxaca
Rivers of Veracruz
Sierra Madre de Oaxaca